The Penny Strait is a natural waterway through the central Canadian Arctic Archipelago in the territory of Nunavut. It separates Bathurst Island (to the south-west) from Devon Island (to the east). To the south and south-east, the strait opens into Queens Channel.

Straits of Qikiqtaaluk Region